In baseball, a hit is credited to a batter when he reaches first base – or any subsequent base – safely after hitting a fair ball, without the benefit of an error or a fielder's choice.  One hundred seventeen different players have recorded at least six hits in a single nine-inning Major League Baseball game, the most recent being Lourdes Gurriel Jr. of the Toronto Blue Jays on July 22, 2022.  Five players have accomplished the feat more than once in their career; no player has ever recorded more than seven hits in a nine-inning game.  Davy Force was the first player to collect six hits in a single game, doing so for the Philadelphia Athletics against the Chicago White Stockings on June 27, 1876.

These games have resulted in other single-game MLB records being set in connection with the prodigious offensive performance.  Shawn Green, for example, established a new major league record with 19 total bases and finished with a total of five extra-base hits, tying a National League record that was also achieved by Larry Twitchell during the latter's six-hit game.  Four of Green's six hits were home runs, equaling the record for most home runs in one game.  Jim Bottomley, Walker Cooper, Anthony Rendon, and Wilbert Robinson hit 10 or more runs batted in (RBI) to complement their six hits.  Robinson proceeded to collect a seventh hit and an eleventh RBI to set single-game records in both categories.  Although his record of 11 RBIs has since been broken, Robinson's seven hits in a nine-inning game has been matched only by Rennie Stennett.

Guy Hecker, the only pitcher to have accomplished the feat, also broke the single-game major league record for runs scored with seven.  Cal McVey is the sole player to collect six hits in each of two consecutive games.  Seven players hit for the cycle during their six-hit game.  Zaza Harvey has the fewest career hits among players who have six hits in one game with 86, while Ty Cobb – with 4,189 – had more hits than any other player in this group and amassed the second most in major league history.  Cobb, Cal Ripken Jr., and Paul Waner are also members of the 3,000 hit club.

Of the 75 players eligible for the Baseball Hall of Fame who have recorded six hits in a nine-inning game, eighteen have been elected, three on the first ballot.  Players are eligible for the Hall of Fame if they have played in at least 10 MLB seasons, and have either been retired for five seasons or deceased for at least six months.  These requirements leave six players ineligible who are active, six players ineligible who are living and have played in the past five seasons, and twenty-six players ineligible who did not play in 10 seasons.

Players

{| class="wikitable sortable plainrowheaders" style="text-align:center;"
|+MLB hitters with six hits in a nine-inning game
!scope="col"|Player
!scope="col"|Date
!scope="col"|Team
!scope="col"|Lge.
!scope="col"|Opposing team
!scope="col"|AB
!scope="col"|Hits
!scope="col"|2B
!scope="col"|3B
!scope="col"|HR
!scope="col"|Career hits
!scope="col" class="unsortable"|Box
!scope="col" class="unsortable"|Ref
|-
!scope="row" style="text-align:center"|
|
|Philadelphia Athletics
|NL
|Chicago White Stockings
|6||6||1||0||0||1,059
|||
|-
!scope="row" style="text-align:center"|
|
|Chicago White Stockings
|NL
|Louisville Grays
|7||6||1||0||0||869
|||
|-
!scope="row" style="text-align:center"| 
|
|Chicago White Stockings
|NL
|Cincinnati Reds
|7||6||1||0||0||869
|||
|-
!scope="row" style="text-align:center"|
|
|Chicago White Stockings
|NL
|Cincinnati Reds
|6||6||1||1||0||860
|||
|-
!scope="row" style="text-align:center"|
|
|Chicago White Stockings
|NL
|Cincinnati Reds
|6||6||0||0||0||1,612
|||
|-
!scope="row" style="text-align:center"|
|
|Worcester Ruby Legs
|NL
|Buffalo Bisons
|6||6||0||1||0||500
|||
|-
!scope="row" style="text-align:center"|
|
|Boston Beaneaters
|NL
|Philadelphia Quakers
|7||6||1||1||0||1,281
|||
|-
!scope="row" style="text-align:center; background:#ffb;"|
|
|Buffalo Bisons
|NL
|Philadelphia Quakers
|6||6||2||0||0||2,296
|||
|-
!scope="row" style="text-align:center"|
|
|Cincinnati Red Stockings
|AA
|Pittsburgh Alleghenys
|7||6||0||0||0||1,202
|||
|-
!scope="row" style="text-align:center"|
|
|Cincinnati Red Stockings
|AA
|Pittsburgh Alleghenys
|7
|style="background-color:#FFE6BD;"|6
|style="background-color:#FFE6BD;"|1
|style="background-color:#FFE6BD;"|1
|style="background-color:#FFE6BD;"|1
|1,352
|||
|-
!scope="row" style="text-align:center"|
|
|Brooklyn Atlantics
|AA
|St. Louis Browns
|6||6||1||1||0||287
|||
|-
!scope="row" style="text-align:center"|
|
|Philadelphia Athletics
|AA
|Washington Nationals
|6||6||0||1||0||555
|||
|-
!scope="row" style="text-align:center"|
|
|New York Metropolitans
|AA
||St. Louis Browns
|6
|style="background-color:#FFE6BD;"|6
|style="background-color:#FFE6BD;"|2
|style="background-color:#FFE6BD;"|1
|style="background-color:#FFE6BD;"|1
|1,125
|||
|-
!scope="row" style="text-align:center"|
|
|Philadelphia Athletics
|AA
|Pittsburgh Alleghenys
|6
|style="background-color:#FFE6BD;"|6
|style="background-color:#FFE6BD;"|2
|style="background-color:#FFE6BD;"|1
|style="background-color:#FFE6BD;"|1
|1,429
|||
|-
!scope="row" style="text-align:center"|
|
|Brooklyn Grays
|AA
|Philadelphia Athletics
|6||6||0||0||0||1,212
|||
|-
!scope="row" style="text-align:center"|
|
|St. Louis Browns
|AA
|Louisville Colonels
|6||6||0||1||0||1,836
|||
|-
!scope="row" style="text-align:center"|
|
|Louisville Colonels
|AA
|Baltimore Orioles
|7||6||0||0||3||812
|||
|-
!scope="row" style="text-align:center"|
|
|Philadelphia Athletics
|AA
|New York Metropolitans
|6||6||2||1||0||1,334
|||
|-
!scope="row" style="text-align:center"|
|
|Louisville Colonels
|AA
|Brooklyn Grays
|6||6||0||0||0||524
|||
|-
!scope="row" style="text-align:center"|
|
|New York Giants
|NL
|Washington Nationals
|7||6||0||0||0||1,129
|||
|-
!scope="row" style="text-align:center; background:#ffb;"|
|
|Boston Beaneaters
|NL
|Pittsburgh Alleghenys
|7||6||1||0||1||1,813
|||
|-
!scope="row" style="text-align:center"|
|
|Cleveland Blues
|AA
|Louisville Colonels
|7||6||0||1||0||931
|||
|-
!scope="row" style="text-align:center"|
|
|Kansas City Cowboys
|AA
|Cincinnati Red Stockings
|6||6||0||0||1||794
|||
|-
!scope="row" style="text-align:center"|
|
|Indianapolis Hoosiers
|NL
|Pittsburgh Alleghenys
|6||6||1||0||1||1,286
|||
|-
!scope="row" style="text-align:center"|
|
|Brooklyn Bridegrooms
|AA
|Columbus Solons
|6||6||3||0||0||805
|||
|-
!scope="row" style="text-align:center"|
|
|Cleveland Spiders
|NL
|Boston Beaneaters
|6
|style="background-color:#FFE6BD;"|6
|style="background-color:#FFE6BD;"|1
|style="background-color:#FFE6BD;"|3
|style="background-color:#FFE6BD;"|1
|676
|||
|-
!scope="row" style="text-align:center; background:#ffb;"|
|
|Cleveland Infants
|PL
|Chicago Pirates
|6||6||1||1||0||2,597
|||
|-
!scope="row" style="text-align:center"|
|
|Louisville Colonels
|AA
|Syracuse Stars
|6
|style="background-color:#FFE6BD;"|6
|style="background-color:#FFE6BD;"|1
|style="background-color:#FFE6BD;"|2
|style="background-color:#FFE6BD;"|1
|853
|||
|-
!scope="row" style="text-align:center"|
|
|Philadelphia Athletics
|PL
|Cleveland Infants
|6||6||2||1||0||1,564
|||
|-
!scope="row" style="text-align:center"|
|
|New York Giants
|NL
|Cincinnati Reds
|6||6||0||0||0||2,041
|||
|-
!scope="row" style="text-align:center"|
|
|Toledo Maumees
|AA
|Philadelphia Athletics
|6||6||1||1||0||329
|||
|-
!scope="row" style="text-align:center"|
|
|Boston Beaneaters
|NL
|Chicago Colts
|6||6||1||0||1||1,934
|||
|-
!scope="row" style="text-align:center"| 
|
|Washington Senators
|NL
|Cincinnati Reds
|7||6||0||1||0||1,429
|||
|-
!scope="row" style="text-align:center; background:#ffb;"|
|
|Baltimore Orioles
|NL
|St. Louis Browns
|7||7||1||0||0||1,388
|||
|-
!scope="row" style="text-align:center"|
|
|St. Louis Browns
|NL
|Boston Beaneaters
|6||6||1||1||0||1,579
|||
|-
!scope="row" style="text-align:center; background:#ffb;"| 
|
|Philadelphia Phillies
|NL
|Cincinnati Reds
|6||6||1||0||0||2,597
|||
|-
!scope="row" style="text-align:center"|
|
|Baltimore Orioles
|NL
|Pittsburgh Pirates
|6||6||2||1||0||1,728
|||
|-
!scope="row" style="text-align:center; background:#ffb;"|
|
|Philadelphia Phillies
|NL
|Louisville Colonels
|7
|style="background-color:#FFE6BD;"|6
|style="background-color:#FFE6BD;"|1
|style="background-color:#FFE6BD;"|1
|style="background-color:#FFE6BD;"|1
|1,988
|||
|-
!scope="row" style="text-align:center; background:#ffb;"|
|
|St. Louis Browns
|NL
|New York Giants
|6||6||2||1||0||2,467
|||
|-
!scope="row" style="text-align:center; background:#ffb;"|
|
|New York Giants
|NL
|Philadelphia Phillies
|6||6||2||1||0||2,665
|||
|-
!scope="row" style="text-align:center"|
|
|Pittsburgh Pirates
|NL
|Boston Beaneaters
|6||6||0||0||0||1,024
|||
|-
!scope="row" style="text-align:center"|
|
|Boston Beaneaters
|NL
|St. Louis Browns
|8||6||1||0||0||2,231
|||
|-
!scope="row" style="text-align:center"|
|
|Chicago Colts
|NL
|Louisville Colonels
|8||6||0||1||1||867
|||
|-
!scope="row" style="text-align:center"|
|
|Washington Senators
|NL
|Cincinnati Reds
|6||6||1||0||0||1,882
|||
|-
!scope="row" style="text-align:center; background:#ffb;"|
|
|Baltimore Orioles
|NL
|St. Louis Browns
|6||6||0||1||0||2,932
|||
|-
!scope="row" style="text-align:center"|
|
|Baltimore Orioles
|NL
|St. Louis Browns
|6||6||2||0||0||1,811
|||
|-
!scope="row" style="text-align:center"|
|
|Boston Beaneaters
|NL
|Cleveland Spiders
|6||6||0||0||0||1,546
|||
|-
!scope="row" style="text-align:center"|
|
|Pittsburgh Pirates
|NL
|Philadelphia Phillies
|6||6||0||0||0||1,759
|||
|-
!scope="row" style="text-align:center"|
|
|New York Giants
|NL
|Cincinnati Reds
|7||6||2||0||0||1,807
|||
|-
!scope="row" style="text-align:center"|
|
|Baltimore Orioles
|AL
|Detroit Tigers
|6||6||2||2||0||1,282
|||
|-
!scope="row" style="text-align:center"|
|
|Detroit Tigers
|AL
|Cleveland Bluebirds
|6||6||1||0||0||182
|||
|-
!scope="row" style="text-align:center"|
|
|Cleveland Broncos
|AL
|St. Louis Browns
|6||6||0||0||0||86
|||
|-
!scope="row" style="text-align:center"|
|
|Philadelphia Athletics
|AL
|Boston Americans
|6||6||0||0||1||1,563
|||
|-
!scope="row" style="text-align:center"|
|
|Baltimore Orioles
|AL
|Chicago White Sox
|6||6||1||1||0||1,508
|||
|-
!scope="row" style="text-align:center"|
|
|Brooklyn Robins
|NL
|Chicago Cubs
|6||6||0||0||0||1,487
|||
|-
!scope="row" style="text-align:center; background:#ffb;"|
|
|New York Giants
|NL
|Philadelphia Phillies
|6||6||0||0||0||2,004
|||
|-
!scope="row" style="text-align:center"|
|
|Brooklyn Robins
|NL
|Philadelphia Phillies
|6||6||2||0||1||1,631
|||
|-
!scope="row" style="text-align:center"|
|
|Cleveland Indians
|AL
|Washington Senators
|6||6||1||0||0||371
|||
|-
!scope="row" style="text-align:center"|
|
|Cleveland Indians
|AL
|Detroit Tigers
|6||6||3||1||0||2,018
|||
|-
!scope="row" style="text-align:center; background:#ffb;"|
|
|Pittsburgh Pirates
|NL
|Philadelphia Phillies
|6||6||3||1||0||2,299
|||
|-
!scope="row" style="text-align:center; background:#ffb;"|
|
|New York Giants
|NL
|Boston Braves
|7||6||0||0||1||2,880
|||
|-
!scope="row" style="text-align:center; background:#ffb;"|
|
|St. Louis Cardinals
|NL
|Brooklyn Robins
|6||6||1||0||2||2,313
|||
|-
!scope="row" style="text-align:center; background:#ffb;"|
|
|Detroit Tigers
|AL
|St. Louis Browns
|6||6||1||0||3||4,189
|||
|-
!scope="row" style="text-align:center; background:#ffb;"|
|
|Pittsburgh Pirates
|NL
|New York Giants
|6||6||2||1||0||3,152
|||
|-
!scope="row" style="text-align:center"|
|
|Brooklyn Robins
|NL
|New York Giants
|7||6||1||0||0||624
|||
|-
!scope="row" style="text-align:center; background:#ffb;"| 
|
|St. Louis Cardinals
|NL
|Pittsburgh Pirates
|6||6||1||0||0||2,313
|||
|-
!scope="row" style="text-align:center"|
|
|Cincinnati Reds
|NL
|Boston Braves
|6||6||2||1||0||1,729
|||
|-
!scope="row" style="text-align:center"|
|
|Philadelphia Athletics
|AL
|Chicago White Sox
|6||6||0||0||0||2,705
|||
|-
!scope="row" style="text-align:center"|
|
|New York Yankees
|AL
|Boston Red Sox
|6||6||0||0||0||854
|||
|-
!scope="row" style="text-align:center"| 
|
|Philadelphia Athletics
|AL
|Detroit Tigers
|6||6||1||0||0||2,705
|||
|-
!scope="row" style="text-align:center"|
|
|St. Louis Cardinals
|NL
|Boston Braves
|6||6||1||0||0||1,318
|||
|-
!scope="row" style="text-align:center"|
|
|Cleveland Indians
|AL
|St. Louis Browns
|6||6||1||0||0||1,382
|||
|-
!scope="row" style="text-align:center"|
|
|Chicago White Sox
|AL
|Philadelphia Athletics
|7||6||2||0||0||1,267
|||
|-
!scope="row" style="text-align:center; background:#ffb;"|
|
|Cincinnati Reds
|NL
|Philadelphia Phillies
|6||6||1||0||0||1,792
|||
|-
!scope="row" style="text-align:center"|
|
|Chicago White Sox
|AL
|Washington Senators
|6||6||1||0||0||170
|||
|-
!scope="row" style="text-align:center"|
|
|Brooklyn Dodgers
|NL
|Philadelphia Phillies
|6||6||1||1||0||945
|||
|-
!scope="row" style="text-align:center"|
|
|Washington Senators
|AL
|Boston Red Sox
|6||6||1||0||0||381
|||
|-
!scope="row" style="text-align:center"|
|
|Washington Senators
|AL
|St. Louis Browns
|6||6||0||0||1||1,090
|||
|-
!scope="row" style="text-align:center; background:#ffb;"|
|
|Detroit Tigers
|AL
|Cleveland Indians
|7||6||1||0||0||2,054
|||
|-
!scope="row" style="text-align:center"|
|
|Cincinnati Reds
|NL
|Chicago Cubs
|7||6||0||0||3||1,341
|||
|-
!scope="row" style="text-align:center"|
|
|Pittsburgh Pirates
|NL
|Chicago Cubs
|6||6||0||0||2||1,262
|||
|-
!scope="row" style="text-align:center"|
|
|Cleveland Indians
|AL
|Philadelphia Athletics
|6||6||0||0||0||105
|||
|-
!scope="row" style="text-align:center"|
|
|Philadelphia Phillies
|NL
|Pittsburgh Pirates
|6||6||2||0||0||988
|||
|-
!scope="row" style="text-align:center"|
|
|Boston Red Sox
|AL
|St. Louis Browns
|6||6
|1
|0||0||1,604
|||
|-
!scope="row" style="text-align:center"|
|
|Pittsburgh Pirates
|NL
|Milwaukee Braves
|6||6||3||0||0||2,138
|||
|-
!scope="row" style="text-align:center"|
|
|Chicago White Sox
|AL
|Boston Red Sox
|6||6||0||0||0||929
|||
|-
!scope="row" style="text-align:center"|
|
|San Francisco Giants
|NL
|Chicago Cubs
|6||6||0||0||1||1,216
|||
|-
!scope="row" style="text-align:center"|
|
|Kansas City Royals
|AL
|California Angels
|6||6||1||0||1||745
|||
|-
!scope="row" style="text-align:center"|
|
|Atlanta Braves
|NL
|San Francisco Giants
|6||6||1||1||0||1,617
|||
|-
!scope="row" style="text-align:center"|
|
|Milwaukee Brewers
|AL{{refn|The Milwaukee Brewers were part of the American League until the 1997 season, after which they moved to the National League.<ref name="league switch"> </ref>|name=Milwaukee|group=upper-alpha}}
|Cleveland Indians
|6||6||2||0||0||1,041
|||
|-
!scope="row" style="text-align:center"|
|
|Pittsburgh Pirates
|NL
|Chicago Cubs
|7||7||2||1||0||1,239
|||
|-
!scope="row" style="text-align:center"|
|
|Cleveland Indians
|AL
|Minnesota Twins
|6||6||1||0||0||1,619
|||
|-
!scope="row" style="text-align:center"|
|
|Kansas City Royals
|AL
|Boston Red Sox
|6||6||1||0||2||1,557
|||
|-
!scope="row" style="text-align:center; background:#ffb;"|
|
|Minnesota Twins
|AL
|Milwaukee Brewers
|6||6||2||0||2||2,304
|||
|-
!scope="row" style="text-align:center"|
|
|Pittsburgh Pirates
|NL
|San Diego Padres
|6||6||1||0||0||893
|||
|-
!scope="row" style="text-align:center"|
|
|Chicago Cubs
|NL
|Colorado Rockies
|6||6||1||0||0||2,408
|||
|-
!scope="row" style="text-align:center"|
|
|Milwaukee Brewers
|AL
|Oakland Athletics
|6||6||2||0||0||376
|||
|-
!scope="row" style="text-align:center"|
|
|Colorado Rockies
|NL
|Houston Astros
|6||6||1||0||2||2,333
|||
|-
!scope="row" style="text-align:center"|
|
|Chicago White Sox
|AL
|Minnesota Twins
|6||6||0||3||0||1,565
|||
|-
!scope="row" style="text-align:center; background:#ffb;"|
|
|Baltimore Orioles
|AL
|Atlanta Braves
|6||6||1||0||2||3,184
|||
|-
!scope="row" style="text-align:center"|
|
|New York Mets
|NL
|Houston Astros
|6||6||1||0||3||1,532
|||
|-
!scope="row" style="text-align:center"|
|
|Detroit Tigers
|AL
|Texas Rangers
|6||6||0||0||1||1,386
|||
|-
!scope="row" style="text-align:center"|
|
|Los Angeles Dodgers
|NL
|Milwaukee Brewers
|6||6||1||0||4||2,003
|||
|-
!scope="row" style="text-align:center"|
|
|Toronto Blue Jays
|AL
|Chicago White Sox
|6||6||1||0||0||1,113
|||
|-
!scope="row" style="text-align:center"|
|
|Detroit Tigers
|AL
|Kansas City Royals
|6||6||1||0||2||1,146
|||
|-
!scope="row" style="text-align:center"|
|
|Cleveland Indians
|AL
|New York Yankees
|7||6||2||0||0||2,877
|||
|-
!scope="row" style="text-align:center"|
|
|Kansas City Royals
|AL
|Detroit Tigers
|7||6||1||0||0||1,543
|||
|-
!scope="row" style="text-align:center"|
|
|Seattle Mariners
|AL
|Anaheim Angels
|6||6||0||0||0||2,034
|||
|-
!scope="row" style="text-align:center"|
|
|Los Angeles Angels
|AL
|Houston Astros
|6||6||1||1||0||1,298
|||
|-
!scope="row" style="text-align:center"|
|
|Atlanta Braves
|NL
|St. Louis Cardinals
|6||6||0||2||0||580
|||
|-
!scope="row" style="text-align:center"|
|
|New York Yankees
|AL
|Kansas City Royals
|6||6||1||0||0||2,769
|||
|-
!scope="row" style="text-align:center"|
|
|Texas Rangers
|AL
|Baltimore Orioles
|6
|style="background-color:#FFE6BD;"|6
|style="background-color:#FFE6BD;"|2
|style="background-color:#FFE6BD;"|1
|style="background-color:#FFE6BD;"|1
|1,999
|||
|-
!scope="row" style="text-align:center"|
|
|Pittsburgh Pirates
|NL
|Chicago Cubs||6||6||1||0||1||1,012
|||
|-
!scope="row" style="text-align:center"|
|
|San Diego Padres
|NL
|Milwaukee Brewers
|6||6||1||0||0||2,031
|||
|-
!scope="row" style="text-align:center"|
|
|Chicago White Sox
|AL
|Detroit Tigers
|6||6||0||1||0||1,778
|||
|-
!scope="row" style="text-align:center; background:#cfecec;"|
|
|Colorado Rockies
|NL
|Arizona Diamondbacks
|6||6||3||0||1||913
|||
|-
!scope="row" style="text-align:center; background:#cfecec;"|
|
|Los Angeles Angels
|AL
|Boston Red Sox
|6||6||1||0||2||389
|||
|-
!scope="row" style="text-align:center; background:#cfecec;"|
|
|New York Mets
|NL
|Chicago Cubs
|6||6||0||0||2||398
|||
|-
!scope="row" style="text-align:center; background:#cfecec;"|
|
|Washington Nationals
|NL
|New York Mets
|6||6||1||0||3||676
|||
|-
!scope="row" style="text-align:center; background:#cfecec;"|
|
|Houston Astros
|AL
|Oakland Athletics
|6||6||1||0||1||543
|||
|-
!scope="row" style="text-align:center; background:#cfecec;"|
|
|Cincinnati Reds
|NL
|Colorado Rockies
|6||6||1||1||0||134
|||
|-
!scope="row" style="text-align:center; background:#cfecec;"|
|
|Toronto Blue Jays
|AL
|Boston Red Sox
|7||6||1||0||0||458

|||
|}

Six hits in extra-inning games

, 47 different players have recorded at least six hits in an extra-inning Major League Baseball (MLB) game.  Only Jimmie Foxx has accomplished the feat more than once in his career and no player has ever amassed more than nine hits in a game, with Johnny Burnett holding that distinction.  Kirby Puckett is the only player to collect six hits in both a nine-inning and an extra-inning game.

The following list is kept separate from the above list of players who have six or more hits in a nine-inning game.  This is due to the differing number of innings played during an extra-inning game, the lack of a definitive endpoint to the game that would otherwise allow for a fair comparison to be made, and the advantage of having more opportunities at bat during an extra-inning game as opposed to one lasting nine innings.

See also

List of Major League Baseball hit records

Notes

ReferencesGeneralSpecific'''

Major League Baseball lists
Major League Baseball records